Carles Riba i Bracons (23 September 1893 - 12 July 1959) was a Catalan poet, writer and translator of Spanish nationality.

He was born in Barcelona and studied Law and Philosophy at the Universitat de Barcelona. In 1916 he married the poet Clementina Arderiu. He worked for a time in the School of Librarianship.

In 1922 he travelled to Munich to study under Karl Vossler. He completed his classical education by travelling to Italy and Greece in the 1920s. Around this time he collaborated with Pompeu Fabra on the General Dictionary of the Catalan Language (Diccionari General de la Llengua Catalana).

Later he worked in the Bernat Metge Foundation (Fundació Bernat Metge), specializing in classical studies, and became lecturer in Greek at the Universitat Autònoma de Barcelona in 1934.

Because of his association with Republicanism and Catalan nationalism, he was compelled to flee to Montpellier, France, after the victory of Francoist forces at the end of the Spanish Civil War in 1939. In 1943 he returned to Barcelona, working on translations from classical authors for the Fundació Bernat Metge, of which he eventually became director.

He wrote poetic works including Estances (1919 and 1930), Bierville Elegies (Les Elegies de Bierville) (1943), Salvatge Cor (1952), Del joc i del foc (1947), and Esbós per a tres oratoris (1957), as well as translations of Constantine Cavafy, Friedrich Hölderlin, Edgar Allan Poe, Rainer Maria Rilke and Franz Kafka, and classical works including Homer´s Odyssey, Plutarch´s Parallel Lives, and dramas by Sophocles and Euripides into Catalan.

Riba's work has been translated into English by Joan Gili and Pearse Hutchinson.

The famous American critic Harold Bloom included Riba's poetry in his selection of the Western canon.

References

External links 

 
 
 Carles Riba at the Association of Catalan Language Writers. 
 

1893 births
1959 deaths
Writers from Barcelona
Catalan-language poets
Catalan-language writers
Poets from Catalonia
Translators from Catalonia
University of Barcelona alumni
English–Catalan translators
French–Catalan translators
Latin–Catalan translators
Italian–Catalan translators
20th-century Spanish poets
20th-century Spanish male writers
20th-century translators
Spanish male poets
Members of the Institute for Catalan Studies